Dendropsophus riveroi is a species of frog in the family Hylidae. It is found in the upper Amazon Basin in western Brazil, Bolivia, Peru, Ecuador, and southern Colombia. In Ecuador it has been mixed with the newly described Dendropsophus shiwiarum. The specific name honours Juan A. Rivero.

Description
Dendropsophus riveroi is a small species: males measure  and females  in snout–vent length. Coloration varies by the time of the day: the dorsal color is light yellow at night, with bronze marking. During the day, coloration varies between bronze and cream with brown markings and ill-defined brown stripes on the canthals and above the tympanums. The skin is smooth dorsally and granular ventrally. The fingers are one-fourth webbed and the toes two-thirds webbed.

Habitat and conservation
Its natural habitats are secondary and primary tropical rainforests where it occurs on arboreally. They congregate for breeding in temporary ponds and swampy areas. Dendropsophus riveroi is not a common species, but there are no significant threats to this widespread species.

References

riveroi
Amphibians of Bolivia
Amphibians of Brazil
Amphibians of Colombia
Amphibians of Ecuador
Amphibians of Peru
Taxa named by Doris Mable Cochran
Amphibians described in 1970
Taxonomy articles created by Polbot